Michael Stinziano is an American politician who served as a member of the Ohio House of Representatives for the 23rd district from 1973 to 1994. His son, Michael Stinziano, is an attorney and politician.

References

Members of the Ohio House of Representatives
Living people
Year of birth missing (living people)